Nepal made its Paralympic Games début at the 2004 Summer Paralympics in Athens, sending just one athlete to compete in women's shot put. The country also took part in the 2008 Summer Games, but has never participated in the Winter Paralympics. Nepali competitors have never won a Paralympic medal.

Full results for Nepal at the Paralympics

See also
 Nepal at the Olympics

References